Sangra (pronounced as Sung, raa , , سنگرآ) is a caste of Hindu Brahmins

Distribution in Haryana

  Villages in Kurukshetra district:
    Badaulli, Dalla Majra, Ismailpur, Tho

  Villages in Ambala district:
    Addu Majra

Distribution in Punjab

  Villages in Kapurthala district:
   Sangra named village is in Sultanpur Lodhi tahsil in Kapurthala district in Punjab.

  Villages in Hoshiarpur district:
   Sangra gotra jats are also living in Garhshankar tehsil of Hoshiarpur distt. of Punjab.

The Sangra is a subtribe of Hindu Brahmins found mostly in the Jammu region of Jammu and Kashmir and northern Punjab, India.

References 

Punjabi tribes